Edward James Green (March 31, 1948 – October 26, 2019) was an American economist best known for his contributions to the theory of dynamic contracts.  Green received his Ph.D. from Carnegie Mellon University in 1977. His dissertation won him the Alexander Henderson Award for excellence in economics.  He taught at Princeton University and worked at the Federal Reserve Bank of Minneapolis, and the Federal Reserve Bank of Chicago, and was Professor of Economics at Pennsylvania State University.

In a 1984 article written with Robert Porter published in Econometrica, Green and Porter showed that price wars can periodically occur even among firms that are colluding in an optimal fashion.

In a 1987 contribution ("Lending and the Smoothing of Uninsurable Income"), he studied the optimal consumption allocation that a planner would choose if he could not observe households' income, and that income was uncertain to households. The planner faces a trade-off between insuring households and enticing the households to reveal if they have had high or low income. Green showed that the allocation was related to Milton Friedman's permanent income theory. This contribution is one of the earliest in the economic field of dynamic contracts.

Green died from cancer at Mount Nittany Medical Center in State College, Pennsylvania on October 26, 2019, at age 71.

References

External links 
 An interview with Ed Green: https://web.archive.org/web/20080830011005/http://minneapolisfed.org/pubs/region/05-12/green.cfm
 

1948 births
2019 deaths
20th-century American economists
21st-century American economists
Carnegie Mellon University alumni
Deaths from cancer in Pennsylvania
Fellows of the Econometric Society
Information economists
Pennsylvania State University faculty
University of Pittsburgh alumni